Eucalyptus repullulans, commonly known as chrysoprase mallee, is a species of mallee that is native to arid parts of Western Australia and the far north-west of South Australia. It has smooth bark, lance-shaped adult leaves, flower buds in groups of between seven and thirteen, cream-coloured flowers and cup-shaped, cylindrical or conical fruit.

Description
It has smooth pink and grey over cream bark that is shed in strips and ribbons. Flowering has been recorded in May and the flowers are creamy white. The fruit is a woody, elongated cup-shaped, cylindrical or conical capsule with the valves near rim level.

Taxonomy
Eucalyptus repullulans was first formally described in 1997 by Dean Nicolle in the journal Nuytsia from material he collected from the summit of Mount Nameless near Tom Price in 1994. The specific epithet (repullulans) is a Latin word meaning "sprouting again", in reference to the mallee habit of this species.

This eucalypt belongs in subgenus Symphyomyrtus section Dumaria in a large sub-group, series Rufispermae, composed of 37 described species and subspecies including E. kondininensis, E. gypsophila and E. striaticalyx.

Distribution
Chrysoprase mallee occurs in the Pilbara region of Western Australia and the central ranges of far north western South Australia where it is found on mountain and hills slopes and summits. It grows in rocky skeletal soils often among outcrops of chrysoprase.

See also
List of Eucalyptus species

References

Eucalypts of Western Australia
repullulans
Myrtales of Australia
Flora of South Australia
Plants described in 1997
Mallees (habit)